Thadou people are an indigenous ethnic group of Chin-Kuki inhabiting North-east India. Thadou is a dialect of the Tibeto-Burman family. Thadou population have been reported only in India, some small population have settled in Nagaland, Assam, Tripura, Meghalaya, Mizoram and Delhi.

References

Other sources
Shaw, William. 1929. Notes on the Thadou kuki.
Shakespear, J. Part I, London, 1912, The Lushai Kuki Clans. Aizawl : Tribal Research Unit.
Tribal Research Institute. 1994. The Tribes of Mizoram. (A Dissertation) Aizawl: Tribal Research Institute, Directorate of Art and Culture.
The Socio-Economics Of Linguistic Identity A Case Study In The Lushai Hills. Satarupa Dattamajumdar, Ph.D.
Lieut. R. Stewart in the Journal of the Asiatic Society of Bengal (1857). entitled "A slight notice of the Grammar of Thadou or New Kookie language."

External links
 
 
 

Kuki tribes
Ethnic groups in India
Ethnic groups in Myanmar
Ethnic groups in Bangladesh
Scheduled Tribes of Manipur